The Great Miami River (also called the Miami River) (Shawnee: Msimiyamithiipi) is a tributary of the Ohio River, approximately  long, in southwestern Ohio and Indiana in the United States. The Great Miami originates at the man-made Indian Lake and flows south through the cities of Sidney, Piqua, Troy, Dayton, Middletown and Hamilton.

The river is named for the Miami, an Algonquian-speaking Native American people who lived in the region during the early days of European settlement. They were forced to relocate to the west to escape pressure from European-American settlers.

The region surrounding the Great Miami River is known as the Miami Valley. This term is used in the upper portions of the valley as a moniker for the economic-cultural region centered primarily on the Greater Dayton area.  As the lower portions of the Miami Valley fall under the influence of Cincinnati and the Ohio River Valley, residents of the lower area do not identify with the Miami in the same way.

Course
Indian Lake is an artificial reservoir which receives the flow from the North and South forks of the Great Miami River. It flows south and southwest, past Sidney, and is joined by Loramie Creek in northern Miami County. It flows south past Piqua and Troy, and through Taylorsville Dam in  Huber Heights and Vandalia. It continues through Dayton, where it is joined by the Stillwater and the Mad rivers and Wolf Creek.

From Dayton it flows southwest past Miamisburg, Franklin, Middletown and Hamilton in the southwest corner of Ohio. The river meanders across the state line near Lawrenceburg, Indiana in the last two miles (3 km) before reaching its mouth approximately ¼ mile east of the border in Ohio.

The border of Ohio and Indiana was based on where the confluence of the Ohio and Great Miami Rivers was in 1800.

Natural and human history

In the 1700s, the French called the river Riviere à la Roche ("River of the Rocks"). This name was directly taken from the Myaamia language (Miami-Illinois) of the Miami Nation that lived in the area (ahseni siipiiwi, meaing Rock River).

The Miami and Erie Canal, which connected the Ohio River with Lake Erie, was built through the Great Miami watershed. The first portion of the canal, from Cincinnati to Middletown, was operational in 1828, and extended to Dayton in 1830. Water from the Great Miami fed into the canal. A later extension to the canal, the Sidney Feeder, drew water from the upper reaches of the Great Miami from near Port Jefferson and Sidney. The canal served as the principal north-south route of transportation from Toledo to Cincinnati for western Ohio until being supplanted in the 1850s by railroads.

As was common in early industrial days, beginning in the 19th century the river served as a source of water and a method to dispose of wastes for a variety of major industrial firms, including Armco Steel, Champion International Paper, Black Clawson, Fernald and many others.  Heightened attention to water pollution in the late 1950s and 1960s has led to significant improvements in waste disposal and water quality.

Following a catastrophic flood in March 1913, the Miami Conservancy District was established in 1914 to build dams, levees and storage areas as well as dredge and straighten channels to control flooding of the river.

Crossings

Alternate names

The Great Miami River has also been known as: 	
 Assereniet River
 Big Miami River
 Gran Miammee Fiume
 Grande Miami Riviere
 Great Miama River
 Great Miamia River
 Great Miammee River
 Great Mineami River
 Miami River
 Riviere à la Roche
 Rocky Fiume
 Rocky River
 Big Mineamy River
 Great Miamis River
 Great Miyamis River
 Miamis River
 Riviere La Rushes
 Rockey River

Tributaries

 Clear Creek (Great Miami River)
 Loramie Creek
 Mad River (Ohio)
 Stillwater River (Ohio)
 Twin Creek
 Whitewater River
 Wolf Creek
 Indian Creek (Ohio)
 Taylor Creek (Ohio)
 Four Mile Creek (Ohio)
 Holes Creek

See also
 List of rivers of Indiana
 List of rivers of Ohio
 Little Miami River

References

 Arthur Benke & Colbert Cushing, Rivers of North America, Elsevier Academic Press, 2005

External links

Rivers of Ohio
Rivers of Indiana
Tributaries of the Ohio River
Bodies of water of Dearborn County, Indiana
Rivers of Butler County, Ohio
Rivers of Hamilton County, Ohio
Rivers of Logan County, Ohio
Rivers of Miami County, Ohio
Rivers of Montgomery County, Ohio
Rivers of Shelby County, Ohio
Rivers of Warren County, Ohio